Maurice Broaddus Rowe III (October 4, 1922 – November 26, 2014) was an American civil servant who served in multiple senior roles in Virginia's state government. In 1972, Governor Linwood Holton appointed him the Commonwealth's first Secretary of Commerce and Resources after he had served the previous seven years as Commissioner of the Virginia Department of Agriculture and Consumer Services.

Rowe graduated from Virginia Tech in 1948 with a degree in agricultural education following a hiatus from school during which he served in World War II.

References

External links
 

1922 births
2014 deaths
State cabinet secretaries of Virginia
Virginia Tech alumni
American military personnel of World War II